Albany Avenue Historic District is a national historic district located at Nassau in Rensselaer County, New York.  It consists of 10 contributing buildings.  They date from about 1800 to about 1920 and include seven Federal styles residences, two early 20th century residences, and one Greek Revival temple-style residence.

It was listed on the National Register of Historic Places in 1978.

References

Houses on the National Register of Historic Places in New York (state)
Historic districts on the National Register of Historic Places in New York (state)
Federal architecture in New York (state)
Greek Revival architecture in New York (state)
Houses in Rensselaer County, New York
National Register of Historic Places in Rensselaer County, New York